The Rural Municipality of Lake Alma No. 8 is a rural municipality (RM) in the Canadian province of Saskatchewan within Census Division No. 2 and  Division No. 2. Located in the southeast portion of the province, it is adjacent to the United States border, neighbouring Sheridan County in Montana and Divide County in North Dakota.

History 
The RM of Lake Alma No. 8 incorporated as a rural municipality on May 5, 1913.

Geography

Communities and localities 
The following urban municipalities are surrounded by the RM.

Villages
Lake Alma

The following unincorporated communities are within the RM.

Organized hamlets
Beaubier

Localities
Blooming

Sandoff Lake IBA 
The IBA site encompasses Sandoff Lake and the surrounding shoreline totalling . Sandoff Lake is an endorheic, salt lake with an irregularly shaped shoreline with multiple small islands. The lake has a significant population of piping plovers and, as such, the eastern two-thirds of the north shore is designated as a critical piping plover habitat. This designation protects the lake from development below the high water mark.

Demographics 

Government 
The RM of Lake Alma No. 8 is governed by an elected municipal council and an appointed administrator that meets on the second Thursday of every month. The reeve of the RM is Rodney Robinson while its administrator is Myrna Lohse. The RM's office is located in Lake Alma.

See also 
List of rural municipalities in Saskatchewan

References 

Lake Alma

Division No. 2, Saskatchewan
Important Bird Areas of Saskatchewan